Inna Loseva (née Kashyna) (born 27 September 1991) is a Ukrainian race walker. She competed in the women's 20 kilometres walk event at the 2016 Summer Olympics. In 2018, she competed in the women's 20 kilometres walk event at the 2018 European Athletics Championships held in Berlin, Germany. She finished in 7th place.

In 2019, she competed in the women's 20 kilometres walk event at the 2019 World Athletics Championships held in Doha, Qatar. She finished in 29th place.

References

External links
 
 

1991 births
Living people
Ukrainian female racewalkers
Place of birth missing (living people)
Athletes (track and field) at the 2016 Summer Olympics
Olympic athletes of Ukraine
Universiade medalists in athletics (track and field)
Universiade gold medalists for Ukraine
Medalists at the 2017 Summer Universiade